Mister Knockout is a 2022 Russian biographical film in the sports drama genre, which tells about the life and career of the famous Soviet boxer, 1964 Olympic champion Valeri Popenchenko. The film was directed by Artyom Mikhalkov, the main roles were played by Viktor Khorinyak as a boxer, and Sergey Bezrukov plays the role of his coach.

It is scheduled to be theatrically released on February 23, 2022, by Walt Disney Studios.

Plot 
A film about the life and adventures of the legendary Soviet boxer Valeri Popenchenko, the champion of the USSR, Europe and the winner of the 1964 Olympic Games in Tokyo - about his childhood at the Suvorov School in Tashkent, about serving as a border guard cadet, about his first successes and failures, and about his friendship with the coach of the sports society "Dynamo" Grigory Kusikyants. The story is that in any, even the most prestigious fight, the main thing for an athlete is to overcome himself, his fears and weaknesses, and only then it will be possible to win a real victory.

Cast 
 Viktor Khorinyak as Valeri Popenchenko
 Andrey Titchenko as Valeri Popenchenko in childhood
 Oleg Chugunov as young Valeri Popenchenko in his youth
 Sergey Bezrukov as Grigory Kusikyants
 Angelina Strechina as Tanya
 Inga Strelkova-Oboldina as Evgenia, Tanya's mother
 Evgeniya Dmitrieva as Rufina, Valeri's mother
 Viktor Verzhbitsky
 Andrey Sergeev as a tram passenger

Production 

The Russian cinematographer Nikita Mikhalkov's son Artyom Mikhalkov was a director, the screenwriters were the brothers Vladimir and Oleg Presnyakov, who wrote the script based on real events and the biography of the legendary Soviet boxer.

The film was created with the financial support of the Ministry of Culture of the Russian Federation, the Russian state corporation for assistance in the development, production and export of high-tech industrial products "Rostec" and the sports club "Academy of Boxing".

Principal photography took place in Moscow, Russia, Uzbekistan, Poland and Japan.

Release 
Mister Knockout is scheduled to be released in the Russian Federation on February 23, 2022, by Walt Disney Studios.

Marketing 
The first trailer for the film was released on November 23, 2021.

References

External links 
 

2022 films
2020s Russian-language films
2022 biographical drama films
2020s sports drama films
Russian biographical drama films
Russian boxing films
Russian sports drama films
Sports action films
Biographical films about sportspeople
Sports films based on actual events
Films set in the Soviet Union